Bogdan Mihai Onuț (born 13 October 1976) is a Romanian former football player who used to play as a defender. He played in his career for teams such as: Petrolul Ploiești, Dinamo București, Farul Constanța and Politehnica Iaşi, among others. After he ended his playing career in 2013, Onuț moved to the United States, settling in Houston where he coached at Dynamo Houston's a youth center.

Honours
Dinamo București
Divizia A: 2001–02
Cupa României: 2000–01, 2002–03

References

External links

1976 births
Living people
Sportspeople from Ploiești
Romanian footballers
Association football defenders
Liga I players
Liga II players
FC Petrolul Ploiești players
FC Dinamo București players
FCM Câmpina players
FCV Farul Constanța players
FC Politehnica Iași (1945) players
CS Otopeni players